Sudhir Gadgil is an Indian politician and BJP leader from Sangli district. He is a member of the 13th Maharashtra Legislative Assembly. He represents the Sangli Assembly Constituency. He has been elected to Vidhan Sabha.

Positions held
 2014: Maharashtra Legislative Assembly

References

External links

Maharashtra MLAs 2014–2019
Living people
Bharatiya Janata Party politicians from Maharashtra
Marathi politicians
1953 births